Dao may be,
Dao language (China)
Dao language (Papuan), of Indonesian New Guinea